Abdel Kader Rifai is a retired professional Syrian football midfielder who last played for Al-Karamah in the Syrian Premier League.

Career
Rifai's career began in the youth system of Al-Karamah before starting his professional career with the senior team. He has won many trophies in his career including four Syrian Premier League titles, three Syrian Cups, two Super Cup and helped the club reach the final of the AFC Champions League for the first time.

Rifai began his rise in the international scene at youth level and represented Syria at the 1994 AFC U-19 Championship that Syria won, he also represented Syria at the 1995 FIFA U-20 World Cup. In addition, he competed with the senior team in the 1996 AFC Asian Cup and played again for Syria in the 1998 FIFA World Cup qualification.

After retirement as a player, Rifai went to coaching in which he managed his native club Al-Karamah.

References

External links
 
 

1973 births
Living people
Sportspeople from Homs
Syrian footballers
Association football midfielders
Syria international footballers
Al-Karamah players
Al-Jaish Damascus players
Al Ahed FC players
1996 AFC Asian Cup players
Syrian expatriate footballers
Expatriate footballers in Lebanon
Syrian expatriate sportspeople in Lebanon
Bourj FC players
Lebanese Premier League players
Syrian Premier League players